Arthur R. Donahoe (born April 7, 1940) is a former lawyer and political figure in Nova Scotia, Canada. He represented Halifax Citadel in the Nova Scotia House of Assembly from 1978 to 1993 as a Progressive Conservative member.

He was born in Halifax, the son of Richard Donahoe and Mary Eileen Boyd, and was educated at Saint Mary's University and Dalhousie Law School. He was admitted to the Nova Scotia bar in 1966. In 1972, Donahoe married Carolyn MacCormack. He served as Speaker of the House of Assembly of Nova Scotia from 1981 to 1991. Donahoe was named Queen's Counsel in 1982. He was president of the Nova Scotia branch of the Canadian Bar Association and of the Nova Scotia Medical Legal Society. In 1993, he was named Secretary-General of the Commonwealth Parliamentary Association, serving in that post until 2002.

His brother Terry also served in the provincial assembly.

References
 Canadian Parliamentary Guide, 1984, PG Normandin

1940 births
Living people
People from Halifax, Nova Scotia
Progressive Conservative Association of Nova Scotia MLAs
Speakers of the Nova Scotia House of Assembly
Canadian King's Counsel